The Nicolau Brondo Trophy is a pre-season football tournament organised by Club Deportivo Atlético Baleares (Palma, Balearic Islands, Spain) since 1966. The trophy serves as the official presentation of the first team before the start of the season.

History 

The tournament was created in memory of the journalist former Nicolás Brondo Ferrer (1920–1965), habitual follower and chronicler of the team, died prematurely.

It has been played continuously every summer, except in the years 1976 (it was not organized), 1988 (reseeding the lawn) and 2006 (installation of artificial turf). Nor was it played in 1990 because of the water trickle that fell in Palma and the inability to find dates throughout the season to be played. 

The trophy has traditionally been played in a single game, except four times (1977, 1992, 1995 and 1998) in which semifinals and final were played. Atlético Baleares has always been present in the dispute of his trophy, except on two occasions (1992 and 1995) in which the team fell in the semifinals when it has been played with four teams.

It was played at the Estadio Balear since 1966 until the stadium was closed in 2013. After was played at the Magaluf Municipal Sports Center (Calvià) (2013), Son Malferit (2014-2019) and again Estadio Balear (since 2021). It is currently the oldest trophy of these characteristics played in the Balearic Islands.

List of champions 

(pp): resolved in the penalty shootout

Titles by club 

 29 trophies: Atlético Baleares (1966, 1967, 1970, 1974, 1975, 1977, 1979, 1980, 1987, 1989, 1991, 1996 to 1999, 2001, 2004, 2007, 2010 to 2019 and 2021)
 5 trophies: Real Mallorca (1971, 1972, 1984, 1985 and 1994)
 3 trophies: SD Ibiza (1969, 1973 and 1978) and CD Constancia (1986, 1995 and 2000)
 2 trophies: CD Ferriolense (1992 and 1993)
 1 trophy: CE Europa (1968), CD Santanyí (1981), CD Calvià (1982), CD Badia Cala Millor (1983), CD Santa Ponsa (2002), CD Binissalem (2003), Real Mallorca B (2005), Atlético de Madrid B (2008), Nigeria Sub-20 (2009) and CD Ibiza Islas Pitiusas (2022)

References

Sources
AAVV: Gran Enciclopèdia de Mallorca. 19 Vol. Palma: Promomallorca edicions, 1988–91.  
García Gargallo, Manuel: «El Atlético Baleares, patrimonio del fútbol balear (y mallorquín)». Cuadernos de Fútbol. Núm. 76 (May 2016). CIHEFE. ISSN 1989-6379 
Salas Fuster, Antoni: L'Atlètic Baleares. Una història de supervivència. Palma: Ingrama SA (impr.), 2009.

External links 
Official website 

Spanish football friendly trophies
CD Atlético Baleares
1966 establishments in Spain
Recurring sporting events established in 1966